The Mixed 50 metre rifle three positions event was a shooting sports event held as part of the Shooting at the 1968 Summer Olympics programme. It was the fifth appearance of the event. The competition was held on 21 October 1968 at the shooting ranges in Mexico City. 62 shooters from 35 nations competed.

Results

References

Shooting at the 1968 Summer Olympics
Men's 050m 3 positions 1968